Anolis neblininus is a species of lizard in the family Dactyloidae. The species is found in Venezuela.

References

Anoles
Reptiles described in 1993
Endemic fauna of Venezuela
Reptiles of Venezuela
Taxa named by Charles W. Myers
Taxa named by Ernest Edward Williams
Taxa named by Roy Wallace McDiarmid